Deforce is a legal term, meaning to unlawfully withhold land from its true owner or from any other person who has a right to the possession of it, after one has lawfully entered and taken possession of it. See e.g. 3 Bl Comm 172.

Likewise, deforcement is a broad term for the holding of real property to which another person has a right; used especially to denote keeping out of possession one who has never had possession.   It is an abatement, an intrusion, a dissension, a discontinuance, or any other kind of wrong by which a person who has a right to the freehold is kept out of possession. See 3 Bl Comm 172; detention of dower from a widow. Authority: 25 Am J2d Dow § 1860.

See also

Land law

Legal terminology
Real property law